Open Hand is an American rock band, first formed in Hollywood, California in 1997.

History
Open Hand was formed in Hollywood, California in 1997 by guitarist/vocalist Justin Isham. With bassist Michael Anastasi and drummer Alex Rodriguez, they released two EPs on Justin's own label, American Propaganda: Radio Days in 1998 and Evolutions in 1999.

After touring, the band signed with Trustkill Records in 1999. In 2000, Trustkill issued The Dream, a collection of the band's two EPs and bonus unreleased material. They went on to release the album "You and Me" in 2005 on Trustkill / Roadrunner Records. The band went on to tour extensively all over the world from 2005 to 2009. Open Hand released their next album, Honey, on Anodyne Records in 2010.

On April 20, 2020, the band released a remixed, remastered, and re-sequenced version of Honey for its 10th anniversary.

The album "Weirdo" was released on March 5, 2021.

Band members
Current Weirdos
Justin Isham - lead vocals, guitar
Ryan Castagna - guitar
Ethan Novak - drums
Erik Valentine - bass
Kyle Hamood - keys

Former members - Live and Studio
 Gil Sharone - drums
Breanne Martin (Breanne Wahl) - vocals, keyboards
Alex Rodríguez - drums
Sean Woods - guitar
Alex Organ - drums
Beau Burchell - guitar
Michael Anastasi - bass
Sean Rosenthal - bass
Mike Longworth - bass
Derek Donley - bass
Paxton Pryor - drums
Zach Kennedy - bass
Jeff Meyer - bass
Jason Gerken - drums
Drew Marcogliese- drums
Capt Dave Anderson - bass
Dave Gaume - bass
Sam Hoskins - drums
Steve Riley - drums
Paul Malinowski - bass
Clark Gardner - drums

Discography

Studio albums
 The Dream (Trustkill Records / Roadrunner Records, 2000)
 You and Me (Trustkill Records / Roadrunner Records, 2005)
 Honey (Anodyne Records, 2010)
 Weirdo (Blacktop Records, 2021)

Extended plays
Radio Days (American Propaganda Records EP, 1998)
Evolutions (American Propaganda Records EP, 1999)
The Mark Of The Demon (Blacktop Records EP, 2011)

Live albums
Live At CBGB (Magazine release, 2002; Blacktop Records reissue, 2015)
Live at The Rainbow (Blacktop Records reissue, 2016)

References

External links
Everything Open Hand
WEIRDO
Open Hand on Facebook
Open Hand on MySpace

Musical groups from California
American post-hardcore musical groups
Musical groups established in 1999
1999 establishments in California
Trustkill Records artists